Atep or ATEP may refer to:

 Atep Rizal (born 1985), Indonesian footballer
 Advanced Technology & Education Park, a part of the California Community Colleges system
 Atep, a fictional Egyptian magician in Ace of Wands series 3

See also
 Atepa, a genus of moths